Begadkefat (also begedkefet) is the name given to a phenomenon of lenition affecting the non-emphatic stop consonants of Biblical Hebrew and Aramaic when they are preceded by a vowel and not geminated. The name is also given to similar cases of spirantization of post-vocalic plosives in other languages; for instance, in the Berber language of Djerba. Celtic languages have a similar system.

The name of the phenomenon is made up with these six consonants, mixed with haphazard vowels for the sake of pronunciation: BeGaDKePaT. The Hebrew term  (Modern Hebrew ) denotes the letters themselves (rather than the phenomenon of spirantization).

Begedkefet spirantization developed sometime during the lifetime of Biblical Hebrew under the influence of Aramaic. Its time of emergence can be found by noting that the Old Aramaic phonemes ,  disappeared in the 7th century BC. It persisted in Hebrew until the 2nd century CE. During this period all six plosive / fricative pairs were allophonic.

In Ashkenazi Hebrew and in Yiddish borrowings from Ashkenazi Hebrew,  without dagesh still denotes a fricative variant  (under the influence of Judeo-German, aka Yiddish) which diverged from Biblical/Mishnaic .

The only extant Hebrew pronunciation tradition to preserve and distinguish all begadkefat letters is Yemenite Hebrew; however, in Yemenite Hebrew the sound of gimel with dagesh is a voiced palato-alveolar affricate  (under the influence of Judeo-Yemeni Arabic), which diverged from Biblical/Mishnaic .

Orthography
The phenomenon is attributed to the following allophonic consonants:

In Hebrew writing with niqqud, a dot in the center of one of these letters, called dagesh ( ּ ), marks the plosive articulation:
 at the beginning of a word or after a consonant (in which cases it is termed "dagesh qal"),
 when the sound is – or was historically – geminated (in which case it is termed "dagesh ẖazaq", a mark for historical gemination in most other consonants of the language as well), and
 in some modern Hebrew words independently of these conditions (see below).

A line (similar to a macron) placed above it, called "rafe" ( ֿ ), marks in Yiddish (and rarely in Hebrew) the fricative articulation.

In Modern Hebrew
Modern Hebrew ר resh can still sporadically be found standing in for this phoneme, for example in the Hebrew rendering of Raleb (Ghaleb) Majadele's name.) The three remaining pairs ~, ~, and ~ still sometimes alternate, as demonstrated in inflections of many roots in which the roots' meaning is retained despite variation of begedkefet letters' manner of articulation, e.g.,

and consider, e.g.:

This phonemic divergence is due to a number of factors, amongst others:
due to loss of consonant gemination in modern Hebrew, which formerly distinguished the stop members of the pairs from the fricatives when intervocalic – e.g. in the inflections:
{|cellspacing=0 cellpadding=0 style="white-space:nowrap; border-style:none"
|||, historically ||("jumped" → "hopped"),
|-
|||, historically ||("broke" → "shattered"),
|-
|||, historically ||("resided" → "housed"),
|}
due to the introduction, through foreign borrowings, of:
syllable-initial  (e.g.   "fabricated"),
non-syllable-initial  (e.g.   "hypnotized")
non-syllable-initial  (e.g.   "fabricated"), ג׳וֹבּ  "job",   "cubic meter",   "pub").

Even aside from borrowings or lost gemination, common Israeli pronunciation sometimes violates the original phonological principle "stop variant after a consonant; fricative after a vowel", although this principle is still prescribed as standard by the Academy of the Hebrew Language, e.g.:

Notes

References

External links

Phonology
Linguistic morphology
Hebrew language
Aramaic languages